The Arabic attributive title Nawawi, denoting an origin from Nawa, Syria, may refer to:

 Al-Nawawi (1233–1277), Sunni Muslim author on Fiqh and hadith
 Aznil Nawawi (born 1962), Malaysian actor
 Mirnawan Nawawi (born 1971), Malaysian field hockey player
 Nawawi Ahmad, Malaysian politician
 Nik Zul Aziz Nawawi (born 1987), Malaysian footballer
 Uston Nawawi (born 1978), Indonesian footballer

Nisbas
Arabic-language surnames